Albert Archibald Jelley  (born 13 August 1922) is a New Zealand athletics coach who has coached leading New Zealand athletes including John Walker and Hamish Carson. He has been an athletics coach for over six decades and coached at Olympic level up until his mid-90s. Jelley has also been a teacher, an athletics administrator, and a bridge tutor.

Biography

Personal life
Jelley was born in Dunedin on 13 August 1922, into a family that was heavily involved in sport. His father, Albert Edward Jelley, was a first-class cricket umpire. Arch Jelley has siblings: Charley, Stan and Effie.

Jelley was a pupil at Mornington School from 1927 to 1935, and joined the Mornington Harrier Club at the age of 18.

Jelley married Rachel in 1953, and she was his partner until her death in 2000. In 2002, Jelley married Jean, whom he had met through playing bridge, and between them have eight children, 16 grandchildren and seven great-grandchildren.

Jelley celebrated his 100th birthday in August 2022, saying “Turning 100 doesn’t feel any different than how I’ve ever felt – I think it’s just a bit of a shock when you first look at that number”.

Teaching career
After the Second World War, Jelley returned to New Zealand to begin studies at Dunedin Teachers' College and at the University of Otago. He began his teaching career in rural Wanganui and then moved to Wellington. In January 1957, he moved to Auckland. In 1966, he became the founding principal of Sunnybrae Normal School on the North Shore. Jelley served as principal at Sunnybrae for more than 20 years.

Coaching career
Jelley began coaching athletics in 1957. He took Neville Scott to the 5000 metres final at the 1964 Summer Olympics and helped Ian Studd win bronze in the mile at the 1966 British Empire and Commonwealth Games.

At the 1976 Montreal Olympics, in addition to John Walker, Jelley also coached Rod Dixon and Dick Quax.

Jelley has coached dozens of other leading athletes during his career, including 1988 Seoul Olympic 3000 m runner Christine Pfitzinger, two-time Olympic distance runner Robbie Johnston, 1987 World Championship marathoner Hazel Stewart, 1990 Commonwealth 10,000 m bronze medallist Barbara Moore, 1978 Commonwealth Games middle-distance representatives Dennis Norris and Alison Wright, and former US mile record-holder Steve Scott, who was fifth in the 1988 Olympic 1500 m final.

Jelley retired from coaching in 2000, to put more time into bridge and lawn bowls. However, five years later, he agreed to coach Hamish Carson, who subsequently represented New Zealand at the 2016 Summer Olympics in the 1500 metres. Jelley retired from coaching once more in 2018.

Mt Albert Bridge Club
Jelley’s first wife Rachel knew he was a keen card player and encouraged him to attend the Mt Albert Bridge Club, where he has been involved since 1990. He has been a tutor since 1996 and was president for ten years from 2003.

Honours and awards
In the 1982 New Year Honours, Jelley was appointed an Officer of the Order of the British Empire, for services to athletics. Along with Arthur Lydiard, he was one of four coaches inducted into the New Zealand Coaches Hall of Fame. In 1987, he was awarded an International Amateur Athletic Federation Diploma.

In 2007, Jelley received a Sparc lifetime achievement award for coaching excellence, and an Athletics New Zealand merit award in 2009.

Jelley was appointed a Companion of the New Zealand Order of Merit in the 2021 New Years Honours, for his work as a coach and an administrator in athletics and bridge.

References

1922 births
Living people
New Zealand athletics coaches
New Zealand Olympic coaches
New Zealand Officers of the Order of the British Empire
Companions of the New Zealand Order of Merit
Sportspeople from Dunedin
New Zealand contract bridge players
Contract bridge administrators
Schoolteachers from Dunedin
New Zealand centenarians
Men centenarians